Monster Massive was a Halloween-themed electronic music festival held annually on a weekend near Halloween at the Los Angeles Sports Arena in Los Angeles, California. Many of the attendees dressed in costume. The event was sponsored by Go Ventures.

Monster Massive was host to some of the biggest names in electronic dance music, including Paul Van Dyk, Armin Van Buuren, Deep Dish, Hernan Cattaneo, Carl Cox, John Digweed, Sasha, Felix Da Housecat, Armand Van Helden and many others.

History 

The first Monster Massive was held in 1997. In 2008 and 2009, Monster Massive had a reported 65,000 tickets sold, which would place it among the biggest dance festivals in North America.  In 2010, the event was limited to ages 18 and over, due to the death of Sasha Rodriguez in June 2010 at the Electric Daisy Carnival, and attendance was only 16,000. In 2011, when Armin Van Buuren, Nero, and Erick Morillo were scheduled to perform, the event was canceled.  In 2012, it was canceled just one day before it was scheduled to occur.  It has not been rescheduled for 2013 and would appear to be defunct.

Talent 

Artists who performed at Monster Massive in previous years are listed below.
Crystal Castles
Paul Van Dyk
Armin van Buuren
Judge Jules
Markus Schulz
Hernan Cattaneo
Sasha
John Digweed
Felix Da Housecat
John O'Callaghan
Infected Mushroom
Fischerspooner
Sub Focus
AK1200
Chase & Status
Deep Dish
Steve Lawler
London Elektricity
Richard Vission
Benny Benassi
Adam Freeland
DJ Reza
Behrouz Nazari
Aphrodite
Carl Cox
Christopher Lawrence
Steve "Silk" Hurley
Mark Grant
Jesse Saunders
Eddie "Flashin" Fowlkes
Armand Van Helden
Tall Paul
Derrick Carter
Moby
Gareth Emery
Junior Sanchez
Funk D Void
Misstress Barbara
LTJ Bukem
DJ SS
Anne Savage
Derrick May
Kevin Saunderson
DJ Funk
Roger Sanchez
Todd Terry
Dan the Automator
DJ Spooky
DJ Swamp
Pete Tong
Junior Jack
Antoine Clamaran
Olav Basoski
Robbie Rivera
Nic Fanciulli
Steve Angello
Sebastian Ingrosso
Axwell

Classixx

See also

List of electronic music festivals

References

External links 
 Official Website

Music festivals established in 1997
Dance in California
Music festivals in Los Angeles
Electronic music festivals in the United States